The Calcutta Diocese is one of the 30 dioceses of the Malankara Orthodox Syrian Church.

History

This diocese was part of the Outside Kerala (Bahyakerala) diocese till 1975 . When the holy synod decided to divide the Outside Kerala Diocese , the diocese became a part of Madras Diocese . The present diocese of Calcutta came into existence in 1979. The Orthodox parishes in the North and North Eastern states of India, Kuwait in the Persian Gulf region are included in this diocese, viz. Chhattisgarh, Madhya Pradesh, parts of Maharashtra, West Bengal, Oddisaa, Bihar, Sikkim, Tripura, Jharkhand, Assam, Nagaland, Mizoram, Meghalaya, Arunachal Pradesh, and Manipur. The Diocesan headquarters is in St Thomas Ashram , Bhilai, Chhattisgarh. This was consecrated by the then Malankara Metropolitan Baselios Mar Thoma Mathews I, the Catholicos in 1986.

The first Metropolitan , Kayalath Dr. Stephanos Mar Theodosius  was buried in St Thomas Ashram, Bhilai. He led the diocese into its glories. The diocese celebrated its silver jubilee in 2004. After Mar Theodosios's death in 2007 , the diocese came directly under the control of the Malankara Metropolitan Baselios Marthoma Didymos 1. He appointed Puliyeeril Dr. Geevarghese Mar Coorilose, the Metropolitan of Bombay, as the assistant metropolitan of the diocese. In 2009, Dr. Joseph Mar Dionysius took charge as the Metropolitan of Calcutta .

Metropolitans 

1)Kayaleth Dr.Stephanos Mar Theodosios (1979-2007)

2)Baselios Marthoma Didymos 1 (2007-2009)(As Malankara Metropolitan )

3)Dr. Joseph Mar Dionysios (2009-2022)

4) Alexios Mar Eusebios (2022- Present)

Assistant Metropolitans

1)Puliyeeril Dr. Geevarghese Mar Coorilose (2007-2009)

Organization

The Diocesan Metropolitan is also the Director of St. Thomas Orthodox Church Mission, one of the pioneer missions outside Kerala.  The Mission is mainly concerned with Education and Social Development.

The diocese manages 25 schools, one Arts and Science Post Graduate & B.Ed. College and an Engineering College( CCET-Bhilai ).  It has village mission projects in numerous villages.

Metropolitan of the diocese is Joseph Dionysius.

References

External links
http://malankaraorthodoxchurch.in
http://www.orthodoxsyrianchurch.com
http://www.icon.org.in/
https://web.archive.org/web/20071217120332/http://www.icbs.com/makodiya/

Malankara Orthodox Syrian Church dioceses
Christian organizations established in 1979
Oriental Orthodox organizations established in the 20th century
1979 establishments in West Bengal